Mishi (also Romanized as Mīshī; also known as Mishni) is a village in Sirik Rural District, Byaban District, Minab County, Hormozgan Province, Iran. At the 2006 census, its population was 1,467, in 238 families.

References 

Populated places in Minab County